UNESCO Headquarters, or Maison de l'UNESCO, is a building inaugurated on 3 November 1958 at number 7 Place de Fontenoy in Paris, France, to serve as the headquarters for the United Nations Educational, Scientific and Cultural Organization (UNESCO). It is a building that can be visited freely.

Design
The design of the UNESCO Headquarters building was the combined work of three architects: Bernard Zehrfuss (France), Marcel Breuer (Hungary), and Pier Luigi Nervi (Italy). Plans were also validated by an international committee of five architects composed of Lúcio Costa (Brazil), Walter Gropius (Germany/United States), Le Corbusier (France), Sven Markelius (Sweden) and Ernesto Nathan Rogers (Italy), with the collaboration of Eero Saarinen (Finland).

Description
The main building, which houses the secretariat, consists of seven floors forming a three-pointed star. To this is added a building called the "accordion" and a cubic building, which is intended for permanent delegations and non-governmental organisations.

It is bordered by avenues of Saxony, Segur de Suffren and Lowendal.

Relations with France
The land on which the building is built is the property of the French State. By a decree of 22 December 1952, it was assigned to the Foreign Ministry to put at the disposal of UNESCO. This was done by a lease for a term of 99 years, renewable at a nominal rent (1000 francs per year), near the end of the lease. In addition, the residence of this intergovernmental organization on the French territory is governed by a headquarters agreement that defines its privileges and immunities. Both agreements were signed in Paris in 1954, respectively on 25 June and 25 July.

The French Parliament approved the lease by a law enacted on 6 August 1955, authorized the President of the Republic to ratify the Headquarters Agreement. The Headquarters Agreement entered into force on 23 November 1955. It was published by a decree of 11 January 1956.

World Heritage Centre in Japan
In December 2017, the 'Mt. Fuji World Heritage Centre, Shizuoka' was opened in Fujinomiya city. The appointed director was Atsuko Toyama, a 79-year old former bureaucrat of the Ministry of Education. Despite a striking building designed by world-famous architect Shigeru Ban, the Shizuoka World Heritage Centre quickly became a focus of controversy due to two out of five researchers quitting several months after the official opening, citing concerns of academic freedom and harassment. Notwithstanding continuing controversy, Shizuoka Prefecture and its governor Heita Kawakatsu have denied any wrong doing.

See also
 World Heritage Site

References

Bibliography
 Le Siège de l'Unesco à Paris, preface by Luther Evans, introduction by Françoise Choay, photographs by Lucien Hervé, Gerd Hatje, Stuttgart, 1958.

External links
 

1958 establishments in France
Museums in Paris
Tourist attractions in Paris
Buildings and structures in the 7th arrondissement of Paris
Museums established in 1958
UNESCO
Marcel Breuer buildings
Pier Luigi Nervi buildings